The Red Bank Battlefield is located along the Delaware River in National Park, Gloucester County, New Jersey. It was the location of the Battle of Red Bank in the American Revolutionary War on October 22, 1777. Fort Mercer and its sister, Fort Mifflin in Pennsylvania, defended the river and prevented the British from using it for transportation.  The forts successfully delayed the British, but in the end, they were both destroyed or abandoned.

Today the site of the Battle of Red Bank still has the trenches and cannons used by the 100 American soldiers fighting against 2000 British and Hessian soldiers.  The Whitall House is an original home that was there during the battle and was used as a field hospital.  It is open for tours today. 
The site is a part of the Gloucester County Parks system called Red Bank Battlefield Park.

James and Ann Whitall House
The central feature of the park is the James and Ann Whitall House. This structure, a brick and stone house just outside the works of Fort Mercer, served as a hospital for some of the men wounded in the fighting. The house suffered damage during the battle. Ann Cooper Whitall had remained in the house during the fighting and tended to the wounded, earning her the epithet "Heroine of Red Bank."

Park features
Although much of the battlefield has eroded into the Delaware River, some portions of Fort Mercer (named after Brigadier General Hugh Mercer, killed at the Battle of Princeton on January 3, 1777.) remain. The prominent historical feature of the park is the remains of the ditch which surrounded the now-gone earthworks. Around these works and along the riverbank are several period cannons, including four raised from the wrecks of the British man-of-war  and a British sloop, HMS Merlin. The three American cannons facing the Whitall House were found in 1935 buried on the site. Nearer to the Whitall House, a preserved section of the chevaux-de-frise river defenses of the Fort Mercer and Fort Mifflin system is displayed, along with various cannonballs recovered from the battlefield. Several monuments honor the combatants, including a memorial to the fallen Hessian leader, whose remains were buried on the grounds, and a -tall monument.

Notable Burials
 Carl von Donop (1732-1777), Hessian colonel who fought with the British and died at the battle.

In June 2022 the remains of 13 Hessian soldiers were discovered in land purchased by Gloucester County in 2020 at the northern end of the historical park. They are being analyzed by the New Jersey State Police forensic lab.

Visiting
The  park is open to visitors during daylight hours. The Whitall House may be visited during more limited hours. An annual reenactment of the battle takes place on the park grounds in October. In the early 1980s, a lifeguard was on duty and swimming was permitted in the Delaware River.

See also
 Philadelphia campaign
 Fort Billingsport
 National Register of Historic Places listings in Gloucester County, New Jersey

References

External links 

Official Park site

Parks in Gloucester County, New Jersey
Georgian architecture in New Jersey
National Historic Landmarks in New Jersey
Houses in Gloucester County, New Jersey
Museums in Gloucester County, New Jersey
Historic house museums in New Jersey
National Register of Historic Places in Gloucester County, New Jersey
County parks in New Jersey
American Revolutionary War sites
American Revolutionary War museums in New Jersey
New Jersey Register of Historic Places
American Revolution on the National Register of Historic Places
National Park, New Jersey